Roberts Branch is a stream in Clinton County in the U.S. state of Missouri. It is a tributary of Linn Branch.

The confluence with Linn Branch is currently within the waters of the Smithville Reservoir.

The community of Mecca was on the floodplain of the Little Platte River and is currently on the shore of the reservoir approximately one half mile to the southeast of the confluence on Missouri Route D.

Roberts Branch was named after Littleton Roberts, a pioneer citizen.

See also
List of rivers of Missouri

References

Rivers of Clinton County, Missouri
Rivers of Missouri